Conraua robusta, the robust giant frog or Cameroon slippery frog, is a species of frog in the family Conrauidae found in western Cameroon and eastern Nigeria. This species is congeneric to the goliath frog, the largest known frog species in the world.

Description 
The body is long and compact. The snout is short and rounded. The head is broad and flat. The dorsum is densely covered with small, round warts. The legs are muscular and covered with numerous parallel ridges. The toe tips have large oval discs. The body varies dorsally from beige to olive to brown with irregular black patterning, turning to almost uniformly black in old individuals. The venter is white or black, especially on the throat, .chest, and towards the knees.

Habitat
It is predominantly nocturnal. The tadpoles live in fast, even torrential, water. It is sympatric with C. crassipes and C. goliath in parts of its range; it prefers colder, faster water than the latter.

Conservation
Conraua robusta  is an uncommon species that is probably negatively affected by habitat loss and deterioration caused by agriculture, logging, and human settlements. The impacts include sedimentation of the streams it inhabits. It is also harvested for food, but at levels that are sustainable; there is ongoing work to ensure that the harvest continues to be sustainable. This species is found in the Cross River National Park (Nigeria).

References

Frogs of Africa
robusta
Amphibians of Cameroon
Fauna of Nigeria
Amphibians of West Africa
Taxa named by Fritz Nieden
Amphibians described in 1908
Taxonomy articles created by Polbot